Nesseby or  is a small village in Nesseby Municipality in Troms og Finnmark county, Norway. The village is located on the southern coast of the Varanger Peninsula, near the inner part of the Varangerfjorden. The European route E75 highway runs through the village on its way from Varangerbotn to Vadsø. Nesseby Church lies on a small peninsula on the coast of the village.

References

Villages in Finnmark
Nesseby
Populated places of Arctic Norway